Lambsheim is a municipality in the Rhein-Pfalz-Kreis, in Rhineland-Palatinate, Germany. It is the seat of the Verbandsgemeinde Lambsheim-Heßheim.

Geography
Lambsheim is situated approximately 6 km southwest of Frankenthal, and 11 km northwest of Ludwigshafen.

History
Lambsheim was first mentioned as Lammundisheim in the Lorsch codex in 768.

Politics

Municipal Council

Mayor 
The mayor of Lambsheim is Herbert Knoll.

Sister cities 
  Saint-Georges-sur-Baulche, France, since 1981

Economy and Infrastructure

Wineries
In Lambsheim there are 3 wineries.

Notable people
Jürgen Kohler (born 1965), a World-Cup-winning footballer, was born in Lambsheim.

References

Rhein-Pfalz-Kreis